José Nozari (1913 – 4 September 1985) was a Mexican sports shooter. He competed in the 300 m rifle event at the 1948 Summer Olympics.

References

External links
 

1913 births
1985 deaths
Mexican male sport shooters
Olympic shooters of Mexico
Shooters at the 1948 Summer Olympics
Place of birth missing
Pan American Games medalists in shooting
Pan American Games silver medalists for Mexico
Shooters at the 1951 Pan American Games
20th-century Mexican people